São Paio is a Portuguese parish, located in the municipality of Melgaço. 
The population in 2011 was 602, in an area of 9.95 km2.

References

Freguesias of Melgaço, Portugal